Olga Sõtnik (born 2 December 1980 in Tallinn) is an Estonian civil servant and politician. She has been member of XI and XII Riigikogu.

She is a member of Estonian Centre Party.

References

1980 births
Living people
Estonian Centre Party politicians
Members of the Riigikogu, 2007–2011
Members of the Riigikogu, 2011–2015
Women members of the Riigikogu
Estonian civil servants
Tallinn University of Technology alumni
Politicians from Tallinn
21st-century Estonian women politicians